Cameron Langdon Brown (born December 21, 1945) is an American jazz double bassist known for his association with the Don Pullen/George Adams Quartet.

Biography
Cameron started studying music at age 10, first on piano, later on clarinet. But, drawn to the bass, he found himself playing a tin bass in a student dance band. As an exchange student in Europe, he worked with George Russell's Sextet and Big Band for one year and played with Don Cherry, Aldo Romano, Booker Ervin, and Donald Byrd. In 1966 he returned to graduate at Columbia College, Columbia University (1969, B.A. in Sociology).

In 1974, Brown met Sheila Jordan, gigged with free jazz pioneers Roswell Rudd and Beaver Harris, joined Archie Shepp's quintet in 1975, and recorded with Harris' and The 360 Degree Music Experience around that time.

The famous Don Pullen/George Adams Quartet, with him and drummer Dannie Richmond, developed into an intense and rewarding partnership which lasted during the 1980s. In addition to this quartet, Brown played with Art Blakey's Jazz Messengers, and various groups led by Shepp, Cherry, Rudd, and Richmond. He has also performed and recorded with Ted Curson, Lee Konitz, Chet Baker, Joe Lovano, Mal Waldron, Ricky Ford, Steve Grossman, Betty Carter and the John Hicks Trio, Etta Jones and Jane Ira Bloom.

Brown has appeared on more than 200 recordings. His first recording as a leader, after nearly 40 years of performing, was published in 2003 with his group The Hear and Now featuring Dewey Redman.

In addition to playing gigs and touring nationally and internationally, Brown is currently teaching jazz double bass at Green Meadow Waldorf School in Chestnut Ridge, New York, as well as offering private lessons.  The musician also substitute teaches music theory classes at The New School for Jazz and Contemporary Music in New York City.

Discography

As leader
 Spring Cleaning (VKH, 1992)
 Here and How (Omnitone, 2003)
 Celebration: Live at the Triad (HighNote, 2005)
 Here and How, Vol. 2 (Omnitone, 2008)
 Black Nile (Radiosnj, 2011)
 Is That So? (Stunt, 2014)

As sideman
With Archie Shepp
 A Sea of Faces, 1975  
 Montreux Two, 1975  
 Montreux, Vol. 1, 1975  
 Montreux, Vols. 1 & 2, 1975  
 U-Jaama (Unite) (1975) 
 Steam, 1976  
 The Rising Sun Collection, 1977  
 Parisian Concert, Vol. 1, 1996  
 Tomorrow Will Be Another Day, 2003  
 Gemini, 2007

With Dannie Richmond
 Dannie Richmond Plays Charles Mingus (Timeless, 1980) 
 The Last Mingus Band A.D. (Landmark, 1980 [1994])  
 Three or Four Shades of Dannie Richmond Quintet (Tutu, 1981 [1994])
Dionysius (Red, 1983)

With Connie Crothers
 New York Night 1989  
 In Motion 1991  
 Love Energy 1992  
 Jazz Spring 1993  
 Session 1997

With George Russell
 George Russell Sextet at Beethoven Hall (1965)
 New York Big Band (1978)

With George Adams & Don Pullen
 All That Funk (Palcoscenico, 1979)
 More Funk (Palcoscenico, 1979)
 Don't Lose Control (Soul Note, 1979)
 Earth Beams (Timeless, 1981)
 Life Line (Timeless, 1981)
 City Gates (Timeless, 1983)
 Live at the Village Vanguard (Soul Note, 1983)
 Live at the Village Vanguard Vol. 2 (Soul Note, 1983)
 Decisions (Timeless, 1984)
 Live at Montmartre (Timeless, 1985)
 Breakthrough (Blue Note, 1986)
 Song Everlasting (Blue Note, 1987)
With Houston Person
Christmas with Houston Person and Friends (Muse, 1994)
With Dewey Redman
 Living on the Edge (Black Saint, 1989)
 Choices (Enja, 1992)
 In London (Palmetto, 1996)

With Mal Waldron
 Moods (Enja, 1978)
With Jack Walrath
Revenge of the Fat People (Stash, 1981)
With Joe Lovano
 Friendly Fire with Greg Osby (Blue Note, 1998)
 Flights of Fancy: Trio Fascination Edition Two (Blue Note, 2000)

With Jon Lucien
 Mind's Eye 1974  
 Song for My Lady 1975

With Sheila Jordan
 Confirmation 1975  
 I've Grown Accustomed to the Bass 2000

With Salvatore Bonafede
 Actor Actress 1990 
 Plays Gershwin 1993

With Steve Slagle
 Reincarnation 1994  
 New New York 2000

With others
 1976 Doublet, Mickey Tucker
 1979 Beautiful Africa, Beaver Harris
 1979 Live at Nyon, Beaver Harris
 1982 Real Jazz for the Folks Who Feel Jazz, David Lahm
 1986 A House Full of Love, Grover Washington Jr.
 1992 In the Moment, Richard Tabnik Trio
 1992 Spring Cleaning, Gilbert Isbin
 1992 " Bihogo", Chris Joris
 1992 Travelin' Light, Della Griffin
 1994 360 Aeutopia, Massimo Urbani
 1994 Original Superband, Charlie Persip
 1994 Reverence, Michael Bocian
 1995 Other Half of Me, Bernie Bierman
 1996 Walls–Bridges, Ed Blackwell
 1999 Feeling Free, Grady Tate
 1999 Modern Jazz, Neal Haiduck
 1999 Swimming, Tom Varner
 1999 The Great Bridge, Emil Hess
 1999 Walking Woman, Mary LaRose
 2000 Explosion, Mike Longo
 2001 Group Therapy, Jim McNeely
 2001 Second Communion, Tom Varner
 2002 Into the Sunlight, Bob Magnuson
 2002 Rothko, Dave Ballou
 2003 Ti Adoro, Luciano Pavarotti
 2004 Presence, Lisa Sokolov
 2004 Spirits, Michael Musillami
 2006 Translucent Space, Jason Rigby
 2008 Ceremony, Ceremony
 2008 It's Always You, Lainie Cooke
 2008 Soul & Creation, Raul de Souza
 2011 Just Sayin''', Alan Rosenthal
 2012 Boplicity, Ronnie Cuber
 2012 Early Reflections, Niels Vincentz
 2012 Old LP, Bob Telson
 2013 Sixteen Sunsets'', Jane Ira Bloom

References

External links 
 Extended homepage with discography

1945 births
American jazz double-bassists
Male double-bassists
Living people
21st-century double-bassists
21st-century American male musicians
American male jazz musicians
Columbia College (New York) alumni
The 360 Degree Music Experience members
HighNote Records artists